Grauanthus is a genus of African flowering plants in the family Asteraceae.

 Species
 Grauanthus linearifolius (O.Hoffm.) Fayed - Tanzania, Kenya
 Grauanthus parviflorus Fayed - Tanzania, Zaire

References

Asteraceae genera
Astereae
Flora of Africa